This list of largest universities by enrollment in the world includes total active enrollment across all campuses, as well as off-campus study. The enrollment numbers listed are the sum of undergraduate and graduate students in active enrollment. The universities included below confer degrees of bachelor-level or higher, and either share a central board of governance and a single chancellor or president, or confer degrees with the same institution name.

Many of these universities, particularly those in the United States, are actually systems of separate university campuses, and may not accurately represent a comparable student body. For example, the enrollment listed for the University of California is the population of the entire student body in the University of California system, which is composed of several individual campuses statewide. All University of California campuses are entitled "University of California" and then denoted further by the campus location, such as "University of California, Irvine". Other states organize their public universities differently in ways that further complicate any direct comparisons.

 Indicates if most or all students are enrolled in a fully Distance Learning modality

See also
List of largest universities in the world by country
List of United States universities by undergraduate enrollment
List of the largest United States colleges and universities by enrollment
List of United States public university campuses by enrollment
List of universities in the United Kingdom by enrollment

References

Universities
Largest by enrollment
Lists of education-related superlatives